The Diamond Throne may refer to:

 The first book in The Elenium series of fantasy novels by David Eddings
 An expansion to the role-playing game setting Arcana Unearthed by Monte Cook
 The Diamond throne or Vajrasana at Bodh Gaya, India